This is a list of solo piano pieces by the American composer Leo Ornstein.

Major works
 Wild Men's Dance (aka Danse Sauvage; ca. 1913–14)
 Three Moods (ca. 1914)
 Poems of 1917 (10) (1917)
 A la Chinoise (pre-1918)
 Suicide in an Airplane (ca. 1918–19; frequently misdated 1913)
 Impressions of the Thames (aka Impressions de la Tamise; 1920)
 Arabesques (9) (1921)
 Piano Sonata No. 4 (1924)
 Piano Sonata No. 5, "Biography" (1974)
 Piano Sonata No. 6 (1981)
 Piano Sonata No. 7 (1988)
 Piano Sonata No. 8 (1990)

Organized list
 S001 – Nocturne
 S002 – At Twilight
 S003 – Piano Pieces
 S004 – Nocturne No. 2
 S005 – Three Moods
 S006 – Suicide in an Airplane
 S007a – An Allegory
 S008 – Barcarolle
 S009 – 6 Lyric Fancies

Early published (050-099)
 S050 – Serenade
 S051 – Scherzino
 S052 – Dwarf Suite
 S053 – Impressions of the Thames
 S054 – Wild Men's Dance
 S055 – Cossack Impressions
 S056 – Impressions of Notre Dame
 S057 – Three Preludes
 S058 – Suite Russe
 S059 – A la Mexicana
 S060 – A la Chinoise
 S061a – Poems of 1917
 S062 – Arabesques
 S063 – In the Country
 S064 – Two Lyric Pieces
 S065 – Musings of a Piano
 S066 – Memories from Childhood
 S067 – Six Water Colors
 S068 – Piano Sketch Books
 S069 – Prelude Tragique
 S070 – Pygmy Suite
 S071a – Moment Musical (after Schubert)
 S072 – Nine Miniatures
 S073 – Piano Piece
 S074 – Piano Piece
 S075 – Piano Piece

Named and dated (100–149)
 S100 – Bagatelle
 S101 – Tarantelle Diabolique
 S102a – A Long Remembered Sorrow
 S103 – Mindy's Piece
 S104b – Evening's Sorrow
 S105 – Some New York Scenes
 S106 – A Morning in the Woods
 S107 – Burlesca (A Satire)
 S108 – Ballade
 S109 – Valse Diabolique
 S110 – A Dream Almost Forgotten
 S111a – Three Tales
 S114 – Just a Fun Piece
 S115 – A Small Carnival
 S116 – Solitude
 S117 – The Recruit and the Bugler
 S118 – An Autumnal Fantasy
 S119 – An Autumn Improvisation
 S120 – Barbaro: A Pantomime

Named and undated (150–199)
 S150 – A Reverie
 S151 – A Chromatic Dance
 S152 – The Deserted Garden
 S153 – Nocturne No.I
 S154 – To A Grecian Urn
 S155 – Tarantelle
 S156 – A Moment of Retrospect

Metaphors (200–299)
 S200a – Sixteen Metaphors

Impromptus (300–319)
 S300a – Four Impromptus

Intermezzos (320–329)
 S320a – Four Intermezzos

Journal pieces (330–349)
 S330 – Six Journal Pieces

Legends (350–359)
S350 – Four Legends

Sonatas (360–379)
 S360 – Sonata No. 4
 S361 – Sonata No. 5 (Biography)
 S362 – Sonata No. 6
 S363 – Sonata No. 7
 S364a – Sonata No. 8

Vignettes (380–399)
 S380 – Nine Vignettes

Waltzes (400–439)
 S400 – Seventeen Waltzes

Fantasy Pieces (440–459)
 S440a – Three Fantasy Pieces

Four Hand (including the 2-piano version of the piano concerto) (550–559)
 S550 – Piece Pour Piano
 S551 – Valse Buffon
 S552 – Seeing Russia with Teacher
 S553 – Piano Concerto – 2 Piano version

References

Lists of compositions by composer
Lists of piano compositions by composer
Piano compositions in the 20th century
Piano compositions by American composers